The 2016–17 Perth Glory FC W-League season was the club's ninth participation in the W-League, since the league's formation in 2008.

Players

Squad information

Transfers
 Note: Flags indicate national team as defined under FIFA eligibility rules. Players may hold more than one non-FIFA nationality.

Statistics

Squad statistics

                    

|-
|colspan="14"|Players no longer at the club:

Competitions

W-League

Fixtures

League table

References

External links
 Official Website

Perth Glory FC (A-League Women) seasons
Perth Glory